Arctic Film Festival is an annual film festival held in September in the Norwegian archipelago, Svalbard's town, Longyearbyen. The festival is organized by HF Productions, and is a United Nations' Sustainable Development Goals' (SDGs) initiative. It is the northernmost film festival in the world.

The festival 
Arctic Film Festival was first started in September 2019, and is held annually at the only screening venue in Longyearbyen, Kulturhuset. The event takes filmmakers on environmental excursions in the Arctic region and programs roundtable discussions moderated by HF Head of Production Benn Wiebe. It is organized by Copenhagen-based production company, HF Productions, and is a SMART initiative by United Nations' Sustainable Development Goals (SDGs) platform.

Arctic Film Festival awards winners

2019

The following are the winners of the 2019 Arctic Film Festival are:
 Best Feature Film: Julia Blue (2018), director Roxy Toporowych
 Best Short Film: Night Shift (2018), director Marc Salameh
 Best Drama: Amaro (2019), director Fabian Fritz
 Best Feature Documentary: Salvage (2019), Amy C. Elliott
 Best Short Documentary: Eskimo Inc. (2019), director Max Baring
 Best Student Production: Games of Survival: A Culture Preserved in Ice (2019), director Nicholas Natale
 Best Special Mention: Rear View Mirror (2019), director Jonathan May
 Best Experimental: Backbone (2019), director Eilif Bremer Landsend
 Best Animated Short: Beyond Us - A Last Story after the Collapse (2019), director Maxime Tiberghien
 Best Music Score: Jetty (2018), director Logan Lanier
 Best Directing: Dancing With Monica (2017), director Anja Dalhoff
 Best Cinematography: Realms (2018), director Patrik Söderlund
 Best SDG Production: ZAN (2017), director Rick Grehan
 Best Screenplay: The Venusian Chronicles (2018), writer Lynn Vincentnathan

References

External links 
 

Film festivals in Norway
September events
Annual events in Norway
Tourist attractions in Svalbard
Norwegian film awards
Film festivals established in 2019